Ether Song is the second album by the British rock band Turin Brakes. Following the band's first album The Optimist LP (2001), this was a bit of a departure, relying on more electric instruments. Despite the change in sound, the album was received well by critics and reached number four on the UK Albums Chart.

Track listing

In some regions and versions, the album was sold with bonus discs. The album was later released with the single "5 Mile (These Are the Days)" as a bonus CD, but initial pressings with bonus discs came with the following track list:

 "Blue Hour" (home recording)
 "Self Help" (SBN session)
 "Long Distance" (SBN session)
 "Bright Golden Lights" (home recording)

Charts

References

2003 albums
Turin Brakes albums
Albums produced by Tony Hoffer